Beitbridge is a district in Matabeleland South, Zimbabwe Situated 18 kilometers north of Musina and 548 kilometers north of Johannesburg. Beitbridge district is located in the Lowveld area. The town lies 6 km ESE of the confluence of the Bubye River and the Limpopo on the border with South Africa. It was established in 1929. The town has a population of approximately 43,000 and serves a district of 100,000 people. An estimated 60 percent of Beitbridge's population is female, reflecting extensive male migration to South Africa.

Beitbridge has an estimated 2,570 houses in formal settlements (primarily for government officials and mid-level private sector staff) and 3,000 in informal settlements. Formal-settlement dwellings are mainly two- to three-room brick houses, while those in the informal settlements were among the worst mud houses in Zimbabwe. The informal settlement houses have since been destroyed by the 2005 Operation Murambatsvina (Move the Rubbish), a large-scale Zimbabwean government campaign to forcibly clear slum areas across the country. New houses have since been built using the Mfelandawonye cooperative system. Average house occupancy in the low-income and informal settlements varies considerably, as many people do not bring their families to Beitbridge, but includes at least four people. Recreational facilities are limited in low-income areas, consisting largely of bars and soccer pitches.

References 

 
Districts of Matabeleland South Province